Harold Caldwell Cloudman (April 29, 1880 - July 28, 1955) served in the California State Assembly for the 40th district from 1925 to 1933. During World War I he served in the United States Army.

References

External links

United States Army personnel of World War I
Republican Party members of the California State Assembly
1880 births
1955 deaths
People from Nevada County, California